The Nalchiksky okrug was a district (okrug) of the Terek Oblast of the Caucasus Viceroyalty of the Russian Empire. The area of the Nalchiksky okrug made up part of the North Caucasian Federal District of Russia. The district was eponymously named for its administrative center, Nalchik.

Administrative divisions 
The subcounties (uchastoks) of the Nalchiksky okrug were as follows:

Demographics

Russian Empire Census 
The majority of the population indicated Kabardian to be their mother tongue, with a significant Tatar speaking minority.

Kavkazskiy kalendar 

Notes

References

Bibliography 

Okrugs of Terek Oblast